WASP-12b is a hot Jupiter (a class of extrasolar planets) orbiting the star WASP-12, discovered on April 1, 2008, by the SuperWASP planetary transit survey. The planet takes only a little over one Earth day to orbit its star, in contrast to about 365.25 days for the Earth to orbit the Sun. Its distance from the star (approximately ) is only  the Earth's distance from the Sun, with an eccentricity the same as Jupiter's. Consequently, it has one of the lowest densities for exoplanets ("inflated" by the flux of energy from the star). On December 3, 2013, scientists working with the Hubble Space Telescope (HST) reported detecting water in the atmosphere of the exoplanet. In July 2014, NASA announced finding very dry atmospheres on three exoplanets (HD 189733b, HD 209458b, WASP-12b) orbiting sun-like stars.

In September 2017, researchers working on the HST announced that WASP-12b reflects just 6% of the light that shines on its surface. As a result, the exoplanet has been described as "black as asphalt" and as "pitch black."

Characteristics 

Since hot Jupiter exoplanets are tidally locked (i. e. the same side always faces the host star, just as the same side of the Moon always faces the Earth), there is a large flow of heat from the highly irradiated illuminated side to the cooler dark side. This is thought to result in strong winds rushing around the planet's atmosphere.
Taylor Bell and Nicolas Cowan have pointed out that hydrogen will tend to be ionised on the day side. After flowing to the cooler face in a wind, it will then tend to recombine into neutral atoms, and thus will enhance the transport of heat.
The planet is so close to its star that its tidal forces are distorting it into an egg shape and pulling away its atmosphere at a rate of about 10−7  (about 189 quadrillion tons) per year.

On May 20, 2010, the Hubble Space Telescope spotted WASP-12b being "consumed" by its star. Scientists had been aware that stars could consume planets; however, this was the first time such an event had been observed so clearly. NASA has estimated that the planet has 10 million years left of its life.

The Hubble Space Telescope observed the planet by using its Cosmic Origins Spectrograph (COS). The observations have confirmed predictions published in Nature in February 2009 by Peking University's Shu-lin Li. The planet's atmosphere has ballooned to be nearly three times the radius of Jupiter, while the planet itself has 40% more mass than Jupiter.

Orbit 
A study in 2012, utilizing the Rossiter–McLaughlin effect, determined that WASP-12b's orbit is strongly misaligned with the equatorial plane of its star by 59°.

A study from 2019 found that the time interval between two transits has decreased by 29 ± 2 msec/year since the discovery in 2008. The value was updated in 2020 to 32.53 msec/year, giving WASP-12b an estimated lifetime of 2.90 million years. The study came to the conclusion that the orbit of WASP-12b is decaying as a result of tidal interactions between the planet and the host star WASP-12. Due to this decay, the orbital period will get shorter and the planet will get closer to the host star, until it will become part of the star. The decay is much faster than the decay of WASP-19b, which does not show a decay with current data.

Carbon content
Evidence reported in a 2010 study indicates that WASP-12b has an enhanced carbon-to-oxygen ratio, significantly higher than that of the Sun, indicating that it is a carbon-rich gas giant. The C/O ratio compatible with observations is about 1, while the solar value is 0.54. The C/O ratios suggest that carbon-rich planets may have formed in the star system.
One of the researchers behind that study commented that "with more carbon than oxygen, you would get rocks of pure carbon, such as diamond or graphite".

The published study states, "Although carbon-rich giant planets like WASP-12b have not been observed, theory predicts myriad compositions for carbon-dominated solid planets. Terrestrial-sized carbon planets, for instance, could be dominated by graphite or diamond interiors, as opposed to the silicate composition of Earth." These remarks have led the media to pick up on the story, some even calling WASP-12b a "diamond planet".

The carbon content of the planet is located within its atmosphere, in the form of carbon monoxide and methane. The study appears in the journal Nature.

Candidate satellite
Russian astronomers studying a curve of change of shine of the planet observed regular variation of light that may arise from plasma torus surrounding at least one exomoon in orbit around WASP-12b. This is not expected, as hot Jupiter-type planets are expected to lose large moons within geologically short timescales. The satellite in question could instead be a Trojan body.

See also
 TrES-2b, another planet that absorbs over 90% of light.
 BPM 37093, a carbon-rich star.
 SuperWASP

References

External links

 SuperWASP Wide Angle Search for Planets: The Planets, SuperWASP.
 Star-hugging planet is hottest and fastest found, New Scientist.
 BBC News - Hubble spots a planet-eating star
 WASP-12b in transit (lightcurve)

Auriga (constellation)
Exoplanets discovered by WASP
Exoplanets discovered in 2008
Giant planets
Hot Jupiters
Transiting exoplanets